Gornovo is a rural locality (a selo) in Krasnoyarsky Selsoviet, Ufimsky District, Bashkortostan, Russia. The population was 221 as of 2010. There are 7 streets.

Geography 
Gornovo is located 27 km north of Ufa (the district's administrative centre) by road. Krasny Yar is the nearest rural locality.

References 

Rural localities in Ufimsky District